Antal Moldrich (17 January 1934 – 17 October 2005) was a Hungarian modern pentathlete. He competed at the 1956 Summer Olympics.

References

External links
 

1934 births
2005 deaths
Hungarian male modern pentathletes
Olympic modern pentathletes of Hungary
Modern pentathletes at the 1956 Summer Olympics
Sportspeople from Budapest